The United Kingdom participated in the Eurovision Song Contest 1986 with its entry "Runner in the Night" performed by the group Ryder. The song was chosen through the A Song for Europe national final which consisted of eight songs in 1986. At the Eurovision Song Contest 1986 held in Bergen, Norway, Ryder and the song placed seventh with 72 points.

Before Eurovision

A Song for Europe 
The British national final to select their entry, A Song for Europe 1986, was held on 2 April 1986 at the BBC Television Centre, London in Studio 1, and was hosted by Terry Wogan. The BBC Concert Orchestra under the direction of Ronnie Hazlehurst as conductor accompanied all but the winning song, but despite performing live, the orchestra were off-screen, behind the set. The rule introduced for 1984 prohibiting groups or 'made for Eurovision' acts from participating was rescinded. In total, 335 entries where received, and reduced tot the final eight by a variety of music industry experts.

Lead singer of the group 'Palace' was Michael Palace, previously known as Dan Duskey. Duskey had represented Ireland in the Eurovision Song Contest 1982 as one of 'The Duskeys' and thus became the first Eurovision artist to have taken part in the contest for another country, before attempting to represent the UK. The group 'Jump' were led by Peter Beckett and David Ian. Beckett had taken part in the previous A Song for Europe 1985 and Ian had been a member of the group 'First Division' in 1984, as David Lane. 'Jump's' song was written by perennial UK songwriter Paul Curtis, his 19th UK finalist.

The show was opened by 1985's Eurovision winners, Bobbysocks, who sang "Let It Swing", the English-language version of their winning song "La det swinge". They were joined onstage by a large number of backing dancers, choreographed by Anthony van Laast. The duo were also going to sing their brand new single "Waiting for the Morning", but the producers finally decided to cancel that part of the plan and instead, the two members of the group were interviewed by Terry Wogan during the interval.

The result was determined by 11 regional juries located in Leeds, Newcastle, Plymouth, Birmingham, Cardiff, Manchester, Belfast, Glasgow, London, Norwich and Bristol. Each jury region awarded 15, 12, 10, 9, 8, 7, 6, and 5 points to the songs. The scoreboard, due to a technical issue, was incorrectly adjusted during the broadcast and the final tallies shown on screen did not correspond with the scores announced on air.

The winning entry was "Runner in the Night", performed by the sextet Ryder, composed by Brian Wade, with lyrics written by Maureen Darbyshire.

UK Discography 
Vanity Fare - Dreamer: Polydor POSP789.
Palace - Dancing with You Again: Roxy! TEASE1.
Colin Heywood - No Easy Way to Love: Spartan SP135.
Chad Brown - I'm Sorry: Arista/Bonaire BON2.
Kenny Charles - Tongue-Tied: MCA MCA1044 (7" Single)/MCAT1044 (12" Single).
Ryder - Runner in the Night: Virgin/10 TEN1.
Jump - Don't Hang Up On Love: Magnet MAG293.
Future - War Of The Roses: Virgin/10 TEN119.

At Eurovision
Ryder performed fifth on the night of the Contest, following Norway and preceding Iceland. At the close of the voting the song had received 72 points, placing 7th in a field of 20 competing countries.

Terry Wogan once again provided the television commentary on BBC 1. BBC Radio 2 also returned broadcasting the contest, with commentary provided by Ray Moore. Colin Berry served as spokesperson for the UK Jury.

The members of the UK jury included Mr. T Abraham, Mr. A Brown, Miss M Chapman, David Elder, Mrs. M Heathcote, Mr. P Jenkinson, Sue Lloyd, Mrs. T O'Shea, Quentin Smith, Gary Speirs and Miss C White.

Voting

References

External links
British National Final 1986

1986
Countries in the Eurovision Song Contest 1986
Eurovision
Eurovision